The Revolution of Dignity was a 2014 revolution in Ukraine.

Revolution of Dignity or Uprising of Dignity may also refer to:
 Uprising of dignity or the 1990s uprising in Bahrain
 Syrian Revolution or the Syrian Revolution of Dignity
 Tunisian Dignity Revolution or Tunisian Revolution of 2010–2011
 Libyan Civil War (2011) or Libyan Revolution of Dignity
 2018 Khuzestan protests or the Uprising of Dignity

See also
 Friday of Dignity, part of the Syrian Revolution of 2011